Lucy Renee Speed (born 31 August 1976) is an English actress best known for her television roles as Natalie Evans in the BBC One soap opera EastEnders from 1994 to 1995 and again from 1999 until 2004, and as DS Stevie Moss in the ITV police drama series The Bill from 2008 to 2010. She has also starred in the BBC One sitcom Cradle to Grave (2015) and ITV drama Unforgotten (2021).

Early life
Speed is the second of two children born to Sue (née Salter) and Sid Speed, having an older brother, Dan. Her career in performing began at the age of seven after her ballet teacher saw potential and advised her parents to get her an agent. She attended a local after-school theatre group in south Croydon alongside actor Nigel Harman, who she would later work with in EastEnders. Speed spent two terms at the Italia Conti Academy of Theatre Arts.

Career

Early career
At the age of seven she modelled clothes for Kays catalogue and she went on to appear in commercials for Sunpat peanut butter, then for gas, paint, soup and the children's toy My Little Pony. By the age of eight she was acting on stage at London's National Theatre in Neap Tide, a controversial play about lesbianism and women's oppression. Speed has commented "Mum wasn't keen for me to be a child actress — she thought I'd be even more precocious than I already was… I worked constantly and I loved it."

Speed appeared in several films during her youth, which included playing the role of Josephine Stitch in the 1987 film Scoop when she was eleven. She went on to secure the role of 'young Aurora' in the film Impromptu (1991), which was about Polish pianist Frédéric Chopin and starred Hugh Grant.

Speed made an early appearance on television when she filmed at Windsor Safari Park with television presenter Johnny Morris. She went on to have roles in legal drama Rumpole of the Bailey (as Isolde Erskine-Brown) in 1987, and later appeared in an episode of Saracen in 1989. In 1991 she starred in the award-winning Dodgem alongside actor Sean Maguire. Dodgem was a six-part televised drama for children's BBC, written and adapted by Bernard Ashley. Speed played Rose Penfold, a streetwise love interest for Maguire's character, Simon; they meet at a children's home and then run away to be together.

During 1992–93 Speed appeared as Beki Jenner in two series of Rides, a BBC drama about an all-woman minicab firm, written by Carole Hayman. She later appeared in an episode of the BBC children's programme Parallel 9, which aired in 1994.

EastEnders
Speed's big television break came in 1993 aged 17, when she won the part of Natalie Price in the BBC soap EastEnders. She played the brow beaten best friend of Bianca Jackson (played by Patsy Palmer), making her first appearance on-screen in January 1994. Speed quit the soap after a year as she felt overwhelmed and unprepared by all the press attention she received from being in such a high-profile show. Speed commented: "I was very frightened by it quite frankly and certainly unprepared for it. I didn't like at all the attention that came with being on such a high-profile show. It simply wasn't what I signed up for in the first place---all that craziness. I was very young and extremely shy, so it all became a huge difficulty for me…I honoured my initial one-year contract and then moved on…they did express their interest in signing me for another year, but I politely but firmly declined. They were a bit shocked. I tried to explain in the best way I could my reasons for leaving at the end of my contract and they ultimately understood, and so I left on good terms with them…I had some growing up to do and instinctively knew that growing up more or less in front of the British public for one year was enough!"

However, in 1999 Speed reprised the role of Natalie Price, four years after her initial departure. Her return was prompted by her friend and EastEnders co-star Ross Kemp, who initiated contact between her and producer Matthew Robinson. Speed commented "I have changed. I've grown up and I'm more confident. I've had more life experiences. I've had bad times, lived in different places. I'm a bit more grown up and settled now. And as I've grown older I appreciate that it's much nicer to have a regular job. When EastEnders asked me back, I thought, `Cool, I can pay the mortgage."

Speed decided to leave the soap once again in 2004. She commented "I'd been back for five years and had very little to do the year before. I quite like being busy and I could see the scriptwriters were struggling with Natalie and where to place her so it seemed like the right time to go. It's nice that they've left it open, I'd hate to think the door was shut behind me. Absolutely, I'd like to go back, never say never.”

Other roles
In 1995 Speed played Nell Gwyn in England, My England, a film about the composer Henry Purcell. She made minor appearances in the films Metroland (1997), Keep the Aspidistra Flying (1997), and the Academy Award-winning film Shakespeare in Love (1998).

Her television work includes roles in BBC drama Dangerfield, BBC comedy Men Behaving Badly, An Unsuitable Job for a Woman, hospital drama Casualty and The New Adventures of Robin Hood, which was shot in Lithuania. She also worked on a television series in America called Unsolved Mysteries. She appeared in the BBC hospital drama Holby City in 2004, the Detective series Jericho in 2005, and in 2007 she filmed for the second series of the BBC comedy Love Soup. Speed later appeared in The Bill as DC/DS Stevie Moss from series 24 in 2008 until the final episode in August 2010.

Away from acting, Speed has appeared in television game shows. These include Celebrity Ready, Steady, Cook, and Celebrity Weakest Link hosted by Anne Robinson, and Pointless Celebrities partnering her former on-screen EastEnders husband, Shaun Williamson. In 2007, Speed fronted the first self-protection instructional DVD, entitled "Stay Safe With Lucy Speed". The DVD features special forces and "martial arts guru" Andy Hopwood, and teaches various self-defence techniques.

Stage and radio
Speed has appeared in stage and radio plays. In 2000 she starred in Be My Baby at London's Soho Theatre, playing a four-month pregnant singer called Queenie. In 2004 she toured with the Vagina Monologues and in 2006 she starred in the Louise Roche play/musical Girls' Night, which toured the UK. The comedy play follows five friends as they relive their past at a karaoke night. In 2007 Speed was one of several former soap stars to act in the stage play Soap at the Royal Theatre, which was a parody of TV soap operas written by Sarah Wood. The play also starred Coronation Street's Paul Fox, Emmerdale's Janice McKenzie and EastEnders''' Marc Bannerman. In 2003 she performed in the Radio 4 series Elephants to Catch Eels, with former Coronation Street star John Bowe, and she played the part of Silver in the radio play, Speed and Silver.  In 2022, she joined The Archers playing farm manager Stella Pryor.

Personal life
Speed married model and actor Spencer Hayler on 12 September 2009, and gave birth to their daughter Kitty Bina Grace Hayler on 20 May 2012. They live in Fulham, west London. Speed is good friends with Charlie Brooks, the actress who played Janine Butcher, her on-screen adversary in EastEnders''. Away from acting she enjoys horse riding, skiing and dance. She gave birth to a baby boy Sullivan in August 2018.

Filmography

Film

Television

References

External links

1976 births
Living people
People from Croydon
Actresses from London
20th-century English actresses
21st-century English actresses
Alumni of the Italia Conti Academy of Theatre Arts
English child actresses
English film actresses
English stage actresses
English soap opera actresses